Karditsomagoula (Greek: Καρδιτσομαγούλα) is a large village in the Karditsa regional unit in Greece, with 2,500 inhabitants. It is part of the municipality of Karditsa and is situated north of the central area of Karditsa, separated from it by the Greek National Road 30 (Arta - Trikala - Karditsa - Volos). It has a grid layout consisting of six 1,500-metre roads (North–South) and eleven 900-metre roads (East–West). It is located southeast of Trikala, southeast of Larissa, west of Palamas, northwest of Sofades, and northeast of the Plastiras Dam.

Farmlands dominate the area around Karditsomagoula, the main product being cotton covering 26,000 acres (105 square kilometres) of land.  Other products include cattle, fruit and vegetables, and some flowers. The whole population prior to the late-20th century, and much of the population today, are farmers.

Historical population

See also
List of settlements in the Karditsa regional unit

References

External links
GTP - Karditsomagoula
e-city.gr 

Populated places in Karditsa (regional unit)